The National Council on Canada-Arab Relations (NCCAR) is a non-profit organization dedicated to building bridges of understanding and cooperation between Canada and the Arab world. NCCAR was established in 1985 by Canadians who believe that Canada's national interest is best served through expanded knowledge, social, scientific and educational exchange with the Arab world.

NCCAR's primary objectives are to work with governments, the private sector and community organizations to promote and assist programs that increase Canadian awareness and knowledge of the Arab world, and to encourage the expansion of commercial, scientific, educational and cultural links between Canadian and Arab institutions.

NCCAR's objectives are achieved through the promotion of the three following fundamental beliefs: Canada and the Arab world share aspirations for world peace, Canada and the Arab world have a common interest in increasing trade, and that Canada and the Arab world desire expanded cultural and educational ties.

NCCAR's activities include:

 Promoting greater recognition of the social, economic, political and cultural contribution of Arab-Canadians to Canada
 Making information related to the Arab world available to individuals, organizations, educational institutions, libraries, media and Canadian provincial and federal governments
 Publishing a monthly newsletter and a quarterly journal (Arabica), which highlights our organizational achievements, current political and economic issues relating to Canada and the Arab world and to the Arab-Canadian community, educational programs, and upcoming events
 Promoting speakers that provide information on the Arab world.
 Sponsoring study tours and speaker tours between Canada and the Arab world
 Sponsoring and coordinating the NCCAR Parliamentary Internship Program for Arab-Canadian university students
 Supporting cultural and historical exhibitions between Canada and the Arab world.

External links 
 www.nccar.ca Official NCCAR website

Arab-Canadian culture
Arab organizations
Ethnic organizations based in Canada